Dancy (also Hutchinson Station,  Juleson) is an unincorporated community located in the town of Knowlton, Marathon County, Wisconsin, United States.

History
Originally known as Hutchinson for its first postmaster, the name was changed in the 1880s to honor Thorton Dancy, a superintendent for the Chicago, Milwaukee & St. Paul Railroad.

Notes

Unincorporated communities in Marathon County, Wisconsin
Unincorporated communities in Wisconsin